The 2007 NCAA Division III football season, part of the college football season organized by the NCAA at the Division III level in the United States, began in August 2007, and concluded with the NCAA Division III Football Championship, also known as the Stagg Bowl, in December 2007 at Salem Football Stadium in Salem, Virginia. The Wisconsin–Whitewater Warhawks won their first Division III championship by defeating the Mount Union Purple Raiders, 31−21. This was the third of seven straight championship games between Mount Union (3 wins) and Wisconsin–Whitewater (4 wins).

The Gagliardi Trophy, given to the most outstanding player in Division III football, was awarded to Justin Beaver, running back from Wisconsin–Whitewater.

Conference standings

Conference champions

Postseason
The 2007 NCAA Division III Football Championship playoffs were the 35th annual single-elimination tournament to determine the national champion of men's NCAA Division III college football. The championship Stagg Bowl game was held at Salem Football Stadium in Salem, Virginia for the 15th time.

Qualification
Twenty-two conferences met the requirements for an automatic ("Pool A") bid to the playoffs. Besides the NESCAC, which does not participate in the playoffs, four conferences had no Pool A bid. The NWC was in the second year of the two-year waiting period, while the ACFC, UAA, and UMAC failed to meet the seven-member requirement. The PAC received a Pool A bid for the first time, having attained seven members and passed through the waiting period.

Schools not in Pool A conferences were eligible for Pool B. The number of Pool B bids was determined by calculating the ratio of Pool A conferences to schools in those conferences and applying that ratio to the number of Pool B schools. The 22 Pool A conferences contained 190 schools, an average of 8.6 teams per conference. Thirty schools were in Pool B, enough for three bids.

The remaining seven playoff spots were at-large ("Pool C") teams.

Playoff bracket
{{32TeamBracket-Compact-NoSeeds-Byes
| RD1=First RoundCampus Sites
| RD2=Second RoundCampus Sites
| RD3=QuarterfinalsCampus Sites
| RD4=SemifinalsCampus Sites
| RD5=National Championship GameSalem Football StadiumSalem, Virginia

| team-width=155
| score-width=30

| RD1-team01=Mount Union
| RD1-score01=42
| RD1-team02=Ithaca
| RD1-score02=18

| RD1-team03=TCNJ
| RD1-score03=17
| RD1-team04=RPI
| RD1-score04=14

| RD1-team05=Curry
| RD1-score05=42
| RD1-team06=Hartwick
| RD1-score06=21

| RD1-team07=St. John Fisher
| RD1-score07=24
| RD1-team08=Hobart
| RD1-score08=7

| RD1-team09=Central (IA)
| RD1-score09=38
| RD1-team10=Olivet
| RD1-score10=17

| RD1-team11=Saint John's (MN)
| RD1-score11=41| RD1-team12=Redlands
| RD1-score12=13

| RD1-team13=Wisconsin–Eau Claire| RD1-score13=24| RD1-team14=St. Norbert
| RD1-score14=20

| RD1-team15=Bethel (MN)| RD1-score15=28| RD1-team16=Concordia Wisconsin
| RD1-score16=0

| RD1-team17=North Carolina Wesleyan| RD1-score17=35*| RD1-team18=Washington & Jefferson
| RD1-score18=34

| RD1-team19=Mary Hardin–Baylor| RD1-score19=52| RD1-team20=Trinity (TX)
| RD1-score20=23

| RD1-team21=Muhlenberg| RD1-score21=31| RD1-team22=Salisbury
| RD1-score22=21

| RD1-team23=Wesley| RD1-score23=45| RD1-team24=Hampden–Sydney
| RD1-score24=17

| RD1-team25=Wisconsin–Whitewater| RD1-score25=34| RD1-team26=Capital
| RD1-score26=14

| RD1-team27=North Central (IL)| RD1-score27=44| RD1-team28=Franklin
| RD1-score28=42

| RD1-team29=Wabash| RD1-score29=31| RD1-team30=Mount St. Joseph
| RD1-score30=21

| RD1-team31=Case| RD1-score31=21| RD1-team32=Widener
| RD1-score32=20

| RD2-team01=Mount Union| RD2-score01=59| RD2-team02=TCNJ
| RD2-score02=7

| RD2-team03=Curry
| RD2-score03=7
| RD2-team04=St. John Fisher| RD2-score04=38| RD2-team05=Central (IA)| RD2-score05=37| RD2-team06=Saint John's (MN)
| RD2-score06=7

| RD2-team07=Wisconsin–Eau Claire
| RD2-score07=12
| RD2-team08=Bethel (MN)| RD2-score08=21| RD2-team09=North Carolina Wesleyan
| RD2-score09=0
| RD2-team10=Mary Hardin–Baylor| RD2-score10=64| RD2-team11=Muhlenberg
| RD2-score11=21
| RD2-team12=Wesley| RD2-score12=38| RD2-team13=Wisconsin–Whitewater| RD2-score13=59| RD2-team14=North Central (IL)
| RD2-score14=28

| RD2-team15=Wabash| RD2-score15=38| RD2-team16=Case
| RD2-score16=23

| RD3-team01=Mount Union| RD3-score01=52| RD3-team02=St. John Fisher
| RD3-score02=10

| RD3-team03=Central (IA)
| RD3-score03=13
| RD3-team04=Bethel (MN)| RD3-score04=27| RD3-team05=Mary Hardin–Baylor| RD3-score05=27| RD3-team06=Wesley
| RD3-score06=10

| RD3-team07=Wisconsin–Whitewater| RD3-score07=47| RD3-team08=Wabash
| RD3-score08=7

| RD4-team01=Mount Union| RD4-score01=62| RD4-team02=Bethel (MN)
| RD4-score02=14

| RD4-team03=Mary Hardin–Baylor
| RD4-score03=7
| RD4-team04=Wisconsin–Whitewater| RD4-score04=16| RD5-team01=Mount Union
| RD5-score01=21
| RD5-team02=Wisconsin–Whitewater| RD5-score02=31'}}
* Overtime''

Bowl games

See also
2007 NCAA Division I FBS football season
2007 NCAA Division I FCS football season
2007 NCAA Division II football season

References